Greatest Hits is a greatest hits album by American rock band the Cars, released on October 25, 1985, by Elektra Records. "Tonight She Comes", a previously unreleased song, and a remix of "I'm Not the One" were issued as singles to support the album. It was a commercial success, going six-times platinum.

Track listing

Personnel
 Ric Ocasek – lead vocals, backing vocals on tracks 1, 6 and 10, rhythm guitar
 Benjamin Orr – bass, lead vocals on tracks 1, 6 and 10, backing vocals
 Greg Hawkes – keyboards, backing vocals
 Elliot Easton – lead guitar, backing vocals
 David Robinson – drums
 George Marino – mastering at Sterling Sound, NYC
 Steve Hoffman – remastering for DCC Compact Classics CD and LP reissues

Charts

Weekly charts

Year-end charts

Certifications

References

1985 greatest hits albums
Albums produced by Mike Shipley
Albums produced by Ric Ocasek
Albums produced by Robert John "Mutt" Lange
Albums produced by Roy Thomas Baker
The Cars compilation albums
Elektra Records compilation albums